Michael Siegfried (born 18 February 1988) is a retired Swiss professional footballer who played as a defensive midfielder.

Career
Siegfried made his debut for Thun on 24 July 2011 in a 3–0 victory against Grasshopper Club Zürich.

References

External links
 
 

1988 births
Living people
Association football midfielders
Swiss men's footballers
Swiss Super League players
FC Thun players
FC Biel-Bienne players
FC Aarau players
People from Thun
Sportspeople from the canton of Bern